The Lent Bumps 2013 was a series of rowing races at Cambridge University from Tuesday 26 February 2013 to Saturday 2 March 2013. The event was run as a bumps race and was the 126th set of races in the series of Lent Bumps which have been held annually in late February or early March since 1887. See Lent Bumps for the format of the races. 121 crews took part (69 men's crews and 52 women's crews), with nearly 1100 participants in total.

Head of the River crews

  men rowed over every day, retaining the headship they gained with blades in 2011.

  women rowed over every day also retaining the headship they won in 2011.

Highest 2nd VIIIs

On the first day Lady Margaret caught  but were bumped back by them on day 2.

Links to races in other years

Bumps Charts

Below are the bumps charts for all 4 men's and all 3 women's divisions, with the men's event on the left and women's event on the right. The bumps chart shows the progress of every crew over all four days of the racing. To follow the progress of any particular crew, find the crew's name on the left side of the chart and follow the line to the end-of-the-week finishing position on the right of the chart.

This chart may not be displayed correctly if you are using a large font size on your browser. A simple way to check is to see that the first horizontal bold line, marking the boundary between divisions, lies between positions 17 and 18.

The Getting-on Race

The Getting-on Race allows a number of crews which did not already have a place from last year's races to compete for the right to race this year.

The 2012 Lent Bumps Getting-on Race took place on 24 February 2012.

Competing crews

Men

30 men's crews raced for 15 available spaces at the bottom of the 4th division.  The following were successful and rowed in the bumps.

The following were unsuccessful.

Women

22 women's crews raced for 11 available spaces at the bottom of the 3rd division.  The following were successful and rowed in the bumps. The combined Hughes Hall/Lucy Cavendish women's crew is listed as Lucy Cavendish only.

The following were unsuccessful.

References
 Bumps results: Lent Bumps 2013 Men's Division - Cambridge University Combined Boat Clubs (CUCBC)
Bump Results: Lent Bumps 2013 Women's Division - Cambridge University Combined Boat Clubs (CUCBC)
Bump Results: Lent Bumps 2013 Getting-On Race - Cambridge University Combined Boat Clubs (CUCBC)

2013 in rowing
Lent Bumps results
2013 in English sport
February 2013 sports events in the United Kingdom
March 2013 sports events in the United Kingdom